Cleophas Lagat is a Kenyan politician and the former Governor of Nandi County, who served from 2013 to 2017. He joined politics after resigning as a Principal of Eldoret Polytechnic in 2012. He had previously held other positions in Kenyan tertiary colleges. He was succeeded by Stephen Sang.

References

Year of birth missing (living people)
Living people
County Governors of Kenya